The Erik Dahlberg Secondary School is a secondary school in Jönköping, Sweden. For many years the school focused in technical education. It was opened in 1949 as the Jönköping Technical Secondary School. The current name was adopted from the 1966–67 school year, and the current buildings were completed, step by step, between 1961 and 1994.

References

External links
Official website 

1949 establishments in Sweden
Buildings and structures in Jönköping
Educational institutions established in 1949
Schools in Sweden